Cerautola crippsi is a butterfly in the family Lycaenidae. It is found in Cameroon.

References

Butterflies described in 2013
Poritiinae
Butterflies of Africa